The 2020 Hankook 12 Hours of Monza was the 1st running of the 12 Hours of Monza. It is the third round of both the 2020 24H GT Series and the 2020 24H TCE Series, the second round of the Europe Series, being held on from 10 to 11 July at the Autodromo Nazionale di Monza. The race was won by Jürgen Häring, Taki Konstantinou and Alfred Renauer driving for Herberth Motorsport.

Schedule
The race was split into two parts, the first being 4 hours and the second being 8 hours long due to noise restrictions.

Entry list
A total of twenty-three cars were entered for the event; 13 GT and 10 TCE cars.

Results

Practice
Fastest in class in bold.

Qualifying

GT
Fastest in class in bold.

TCE
Fastest in class in bold.

Race

Part 1
Class winner in bold.

Part 2
Class winner in bold.

References

External links

Monza 12 Hours
Monza 12 Hours
2020 in 24H Series